Eastbury is a village in the valley of the River Lambourn in the English county of Berkshire. The village is situated in the civil parish of Lambourn, which is within the unitary authority of West Berkshire.

Geography
Eastbury has three Sites of Special Scientific Interest (SSSI) within close vicinity to the village, these are White Shute, Westfield Farm Chalk Bank and Cleeve Hill.

River Lambourn
Bernard's Ford on the River Lambourn is found to the west of the village, suitable only for tractors and horses, but there is also a footbridge. Here the river overflowed its banks in July 2007 and flowed down the Newbury Road for over a hundred yards before rejoining the river.

The Plough Inn
The Lambourn runs through the middle of Eastbury, and past the Plough Inn, which holds the Great Eastbury Duck Race on the river in May.

See also

 List of places in Berkshire
 Berkshire Downs

References

Villages in Berkshire
Lambourn